Neochoerus ("new hog") is an extinct genus of rodent closely related to the living capybara. Fossil remains of Neochoerus have been found through North America (México and United States) and South America in Boyacá, Colombia.

References

Further reading 
 Paleobiology Database query for Neochoerus

Cavies
Pleistocene mammals of South America
Prehistoric rodent genera
Pleistocene rodents
Pleistocene genera
Pleistocene mammals of North America
Prehistory of Colombia
Pleistocene Colombia
Altiplano Cundiboyacense
Fossil taxa described in 1926
Taxa named by William Perry Hay